Fort Cooper State Park is a 710-acre historic site in Inverness, Florida, United States. It is located two miles (3 km) south of Inverness, off of U.S. Hwy. 41 on South Old Floral City Road. On June 13, 1972, it was added to the United States National Register of Historic Places. It is also a Florida State Park.

Fauna
Among the wildlife of the park are white-tailed deer, wild turkey, opossum, bobcat, owls, herons and cardinals.

Recreational activities
The park features an annual re-enactment during March of the Second Seminole War. Activities include fishing, swimming, sunbathing, youth camping, canoeing, hiking, boat tours, and nature viewing. The park is also accessible from the Withlacoochee State Trail.

Amenities and hours 
The park also has nature trails, a beach, and a primitive campground.

Florida state parks are open between 8 a.m. and sundown every day of the year (including holidays).

References and external links
 Fort Cooper State Park at Florida State Parks
 Citrus County listings at National Register of Historic Places
 Citrus County listings at Florida's Office of Cultural and Historical Programs
 Fort Cooper State Park at Absolutely Florida

Gallery

References

1972 establishments in Florida
Florida Native American Heritage Trail
Cooper
National Register of Historic Places in Citrus County, Florida
Parks on the National Register of Historic Places in Florida
Parks in Citrus County, Florida
Protected areas established in 1972
Second Seminole War fortifications
State parks of Florida